KQXC-FM (103.9 MHz), branded as Hot 103.9, is a radio station serving Wichita Falls, Texas and Vicinity with a Rhythmic Top 40 format. It is under ownership of Cumulus Media.

External links
Station website

Rhythmic contemporary radio stations in the United States
QXC-FM
Radio stations established in 1984
Cumulus Media radio stations